Mieczysław Kalenik (1 January 1933 – 16 June 2017) was a Polish actor.

Selected filmography
Knights of the Teutonic Order (1960)
The First Day of Freedom (1964)
Stawka większa niż życie (television; 1968)
Tecumseh (1972)
Czterdziestolatek (television; 1975)
Kazimierz Wielki (1975)
Jarosław Dąbrowski (1976)
Pan Tadeusz (1999)

References

External links

1933 births
2017 deaths
Polish male film actors
Polish male television actors
20th-century Polish male actors
People from Międzyrzec Podlaski
People from Lublin Voivodeship (1919–1939)
Polish male stage actors